New Bedford Inlet is a large pouch-shaped, ice-filled embayment between Cape Kidson and Cape Brooks, along the east coast of Palmer Land. Discovered and photographed from the air in December 1940 by members of the United States Antarctic Service (USAS), and named after New Bedford, Massachusetts, the centre of the New England whaling industry in the middle of the 19th century.

It was discovered by USAS at the same time as the main inlet. During 1947 it was photographed from the air by members of the Ronne Antarctic Research Expedition (RARE), who in conjunction with the Falkland Islands Dependencies Survey (FIDS) charted it from the ground. Named by the FIDS for Sir George C. Simpson.

See also 
Piggott Peninsula

References 

Inlets of Palmer Land